Dennis "Dirt" Winston (born October 25, 1955) is a former professional American football linebacker in the National Football League (NFL) for the Pittsburgh Steelers and the New Orleans Saints. He played college football at the University of Arkansas. He substituted for the injured Jack Ham in Super Bowl XIV as starting left outside linebacker. On October 17, 2013, Winston was named interim head coach for the Grambling State Tigers football team.

References

1955 births
Living people
American football linebackers
Arkansas Razorbacks football players
Edmonton Elks coaches
Grambling State Tigers football coaches
New Orleans Saints players
Pittsburgh Steelers players
People from Forrest City, Arkansas
Players of American football from Arkansas
African-American coaches of American football
African-American players of American football
20th-century African-American sportspeople
21st-century African-American sportspeople